Arjun Erigaisi (born 3 September 2003) is an Indian chess grandmaster. A chess prodigy, he earned the title of grandmaster at the age of 14 years, 11 months, 13 days, making him the 32nd youngest person ever to achieve the title of grandmaster. He is the 54th grandmaster from India. He won the 2022 Indian National Championship.

Career

2015–2018 
In 2015, Arjun won a silver medal in the 2015 Asian Youth Championship in Korea.
In 2018, he became the first grandmaster from Telangana state.

2021 
2021 was a strong year for Arjun Erigaisi, as he became the first Indian to qualify to the Goldmoney Asian Rapid of the Champions Chess Tour 2021 ahead of Alireza Firouzja, Daniil Dubov, Peter Svidler and Vidit Gujrathi, only losing to Levon Aronian in tie breaks in a hard-fought match.

In October 2021, Arjun placed 2nd at the Junior U21 Round Table Open Chess Championship (Classical) held in Bulgaria. He scored 7/9, along with Alexey Sarana.

In November 2021, Arjun placed 3rd/82 in the Lindores Abbey Blitz Tournament at Riga ahead of players such as Maxime Vachier-Lagrave, Levon Aronian, David Navara, Daniil Dubov, Peter Svidler and many others. Later that month, Arjun won the Rapid section of the Tata Steel India Chess Tournament (Rapid and Blitz). He scored 6.5/9, ahead of Vidit Gujrathi, Levon Aronian, Sam Shankland and Lê Quang Liêm. He clinched the win by holding Levon Aronian to a draw in a losing position. He was able to play in the Blitz section of the tournament due to a last minute withdrawal by Adhiban Baskaran; he scored 11/18 along with Levon Aronian and placed 2nd after losing to Levon Aronian where Arjun had winning position in 2 Armageddon tiebreak matches.

2022 
In January 2022, Arjun won Tata Steel Chess 2022 Challengers, qualifying him to play in the masters section in the next Tata Steel Chess tournament. His final score was 10.5/13 and his TPR in the tournament was 2800+ which propelled his FIDE Rating to 2659.5 thereby breaking into the top 100 in Classical format.

In March 2022, he was crowned the Indian National Champion by winning the 58th MPL National Championship of India 2022 with a score of 8.5/11. Furthermore, in March Arjun won the 19th Delhi Open- edging out Gukesh D and Harsha Bharathakoti on tie-break after all scored 8.5/10.

In April 2022, he participated in the first leg of MPL Indian Chess Tour organised by Chess24 and clinched the victory with a round to spare with a score of 30/45 (+8 =6 -1).

In August 2022, Arjun won the 28th Abu Dhabi International Chess Festival with 7.5/9 and a performance rating of 2893. 

In December 2022, Arjun won Tata Steel Chess India 2022 Blitz with 12.5/18, which was his third victory in Tata Steel events to date.

References

External links
 
 
 
 Arjun Erigaisi player profile at Lichess

2003 births
Living people
Indian chess players
Chess grandmasters
Game players from Telangana
Place of birth missing (living people)